Iwi Hauraki (born 7 July 1987) is a New Zealand professional rugby league and rugby union footballer who has played in the 2000s and 2010s. He plays club level rugby union (RU) for the Northland Taniwha in the ITM Cup.

Playing career
Hauraki made his National Rugby League debut for the Sydney Roosters in round 21 of the 2009 NRL season.

He made a total of 6 appearances in his one and only season for the Sydney Roosters as the club finished last on the table for the first time since 1966.  He was subsequently released by the club.

Representative career 
Hauraki represented the Junior Kiwis in 2005 along with players such as Frank-Paul Nuuausala, Greg Eastwood, Sam Rapira and Sonny Fai.

References

1987 births
Living people
Junior Kiwis players
New Zealand Māori rugby league players
New Zealand people of Greek descent
New Zealand rugby league players
New Zealand rugby union players
Newtown Jets NSW Cup players
Rugby league five-eighths
Rugby league fullbacks
Rugby league wingers
Rugby union players from Whangārei
Sportspeople from Whangārei
Sydney Roosters players
Wentworthville Magpies players